Electrophaes taiwana is a moth in the family Geometridae first described by Hiroshi Inoue in 1986. It is found in Taiwan.

The wingspan is 25–26 mm.

References

Moths described in 1986
Cidariini